Travis Binnion  (born 10 November 1986) is an English-born Irish former footballer and cricketer who played football as a defender for IFK Mariehamn in the Finnish Premier Division. Born in Derby, England, he began his career with Sheffield United. After retiring from playing through injury he was the manager of the Sheffield United Academy.

Football career

Playing career
Coming through the ranks at the Blades Academy, Binnion came back from a career threatening hip injury to break into the reserve team at Bramall Lane during the 2006–07 season. In April 2008 he was signed by IFK Mariehamn in Finland to further progress his career.

Coaching career
Having failed to find regular first team football Binnion retired from playing and took up a coaching role at his former club, Sheffield United. In June 2016 it was announced he would be taking over as Academy manager from Nick Cox who moved to Manchester United. In 2019, he moved to Manchester United, where he was appointed as the Head of Player Development for the Under 14-Under 16 phase, before being appointed as the Lead Coach for the Under-18 team in 2021.

Cricket career
Binnion  played a single List A match for the Nottinghamshire Cricket Board against Cumberland in the 1st round of the 2003 Cheltenham & Gloucester Trophy which was played in 2002. In his only List A match, during which he scored 20 runs and took a single catch.

Honours 
Manchester United U18

 FA Youth Cup: 2021–22

References

1986 births
Living people
Footballers from Derby
Republic of Ireland association footballers
Sheffield United F.C. players
IFK Mariehamn players
English cricketers
Nottinghamshire Cricket Board cricketers
Sheffield United F.C. non-playing staff
Veikkausliiga players
Republic of Ireland youth international footballers
Republic of Ireland expatriate association footballers
Expatriate footballers in Finland
Association football defenders
Cricketers from Derby
English expatriate footballers
English expatriate sportspeople in Finland
Irish expatriate sportspeople in Finland
Manchester United F.C. non-playing staff